Franklin Island is one of three islands located in Kennedy Channel of Nares Strait in the high Arctic and is part of Avannaata municipality, Greenland.

Geography
Franklin Island is the largest of a group of three islands off the Washington Land coast that includes Crozier Island and Hans Island as well. The former is also part of Greenland, whilst the latter's ownership is shared between Denmark and Canada.

The island is named after the British explorer John Franklin (1786–1847), by Elisha Kent Kane between 1854 and 1855 during his second Grinnell Expedition, after it was sighted by Hans Hendrik and the American William Morton in June 1854. Canada and Denmark also left their flags along with whiskey and other alcoholic drinks.

See also 
 List of islands of Greenland

References 

Islands of Greenland